40 Years is an album by The Dubliners, released in 2002. To celebrate 40 years together, the band recorded an album and undertook a European tour. Ronnie Drew and Jim McCann rejoined the group on both the album and the tour. Twelve new tracks were recorded by the seven surviving members, both present and past, and old recordings by Luke Kelly, Ciarán Bourke and Bob Lynch also featured on the album.

Track listing

Personnel 

 Ronnie Drew – vocals, guitar
 Barney McKenna – Irish tenor banjo, mandolin, melodeon, vocals
 John Sheahan – fiddle, mandolin, tin whistle, concertina
 Jim McCann -vocals, guitar
 Sean Cannon – vocals, guitar
 Eamonn Campbell – guitar, mandolin
 Paddy Reilly – vocals, guitar
 Produced and Directed by David Donaghy

References

The Dubliners compilation albums
2002 compilation albums